The 2nd International Gold Cup was a motor race, run to Formula One rules, held on 24 September 1955 at the Oulton Park Circuit, Cheshire. The race was run over 54 laps of the circuit, and was won by British driver Stirling Moss in a Maserati 250F.

Results

References 

International Gold Cup
International Gold Cup
International Gold Cup